The St. Petersburg–Tampa Airboat Line (SPT Airboat Line) was the first scheduled airline using a fixed wing aircraft. The airline provided service between St. Petersburg, Florida and neighboring Tampa across Tampa Bay a distance of about 23 miles. It was in service from January to May 1914.

History
P. E. Fansler brought in Thomas W. Benoist to start a service using his new airboats to create a service to connect the two cities that were as much as a day's travel apart in 1913 depending on means of travel: 2 hours by boat, 20 hours by car, 4 to 12 hours by train. By plane, the travel time was about 23 minutes. A 3-month contract was signed with the St.Petersburg board of trade on the 10th anniversary of the Kitty Hawk flight on December 17, 1913, according to which the Board of Trade agreed to guarantee meeting the expenses of the airline should it not break even. The hangars promised for the airline were not completed, and the company's green and yellow aircraft Lark of Duluth went missing for several days leading up to the launch date as the freight train carrying it could not be located.

On January 1, 1914, the SPT Airboat Line became the world's first scheduled winged airline service. That same day, Antony H. Jannus piloted the airline's Benoist Type XIV on its maiden flight between St. Petersburg and Tampa. Due to widespread media coverage by the St. Petersburg Times, there were reportedly over 3,000 spectators at a parade accompanied by an Italian band at the departure point. An auction was then conducted for the first round-trip ticket. It was won with a final bid of $400 by the former mayor of St. Petersburg, Abram C. Pheil. Two additional Benoist air boats were added to the fleet soon after. One was used to ferry passengers and the second was used to train pilots. Ticket prices were $5 per one-way flight (approximately $130 in 2020 dollars). The first air-cargo was a bundle of St. Petersburg Times newspapers. Freight rates were $5 per 100 pounds.

The airline continued to make flights until May 5, 1914, five weeks after contract termination. From start to finish, the airline covered over 7,000 miles, 172 flights, and 1,205 passengers.

Commenting on the significance of the St. Petersburg–Tampa Airboat line, Thomas Benoist, the builder of the Benoist airboats, said, "Some day people will be crossing oceans on airliners like they do on steamships today." The airline served as a prototype for today's global airline industry.

Aircraft
A Benoist XIV was used for flights.

See also 
 List of defunct airlines of the United States

References

External links
 View images of the day of the maiden voyage

History of transportation in Florida
Defunct airlines of the United States
Airlines based in Florida
Defunct companies based in Florida
Aviation in Florida
20th century in St. Petersburg, Florida
20th century in Tampa, Florida
Airlines established in 1913
1913 establishments in Florida
Airlines disestablished in 1914
1914 disestablishments in Florida